is a railway station on the high-speed Sanyo Shinkansen line in Iwakuni, Yamaguchi, Japan, operated by West Japan Railway Company (JR West).

Lines
Shin-Iwakuni Station is served by the high-speed Sanyo Shinkansen line.

It is linked by a walkway to the Seiryū-Shin-Iwakuni Station on the Nishikigawa Seiryū Line.

History
Shin-Iwakuni Station opened on 10 March 1975, coinciding with the opening of the Sanyo Shinkansen extension west of Okayama to Hakata. With the privatization of JNR on 1 April 1987, the station came under the control of JR West.

External links

 JR West station information 

Stations of West Japan Railway Company
Railway stations in Yamaguchi Prefecture
Sanyō Shinkansen
Railway stations in Japan opened in 1975